The 1990 New York Mets season was the 29th regular season for the Mets. They went 91-71 and finished second in the National League East. They were managed by Davey Johnson and Bud Harrelson. They played home games at Shea Stadium.

Offseason
 November 14, 1989: Gary Carter was released by the Mets.
 December 5, 1989: John Mitchell and Joaquin Contreras (minors) were traded by the Mets to the Baltimore Orioles for Keith Hughes and Cesar Mejia (minors).
 December 6, 1989: Randy Myers and Kip Gross were traded by the Mets to the Cincinnati Reds for John Franco and Don Brown (minors).
 December 20, 1989: Juan Samuel was traded by the Mets to the Los Angeles Dodgers for Alejandro Peña and Mike Marshall.
 March 26, 1990: D. J. Dozier was signed by the Mets as an amateur free agent.

Regular season
 Darryl Strawberry became the first player in Mets history to have three seasons with 100+ RBIs.
 During the season, Frank Viola became the last pitcher to win at least 20 games in one season for the Mets in the 20th century.

Opening Day starters
Kevin Elster
Dwight Gooden
Gregg Jefferies
Howard Johnson
Barry Lyons
Mike Marshall
Kevin McReynolds
Keith Miller
Darryl Strawberry

Season standings

Record vs. opponents

Notable transactions
 June 4, 1990: Jeromy Burnitz was drafted by the Mets in the 1st round of the 1990 Major League Baseball Draft.
 June 19, 1990: Mario Díaz was traded by the Seattle Mariners to the New York Mets for Brian Givens.
 August 30, 1990: Archie Corbin was traded by the Mets to the Kansas City Royals for Pat Tabler.
 August 31, 1990: Julio Machado and Kevin Brown were traded by the Mets to the Milwaukee Brewers for Charlie O'Brien and Kevin Carmody (minors).
 September 10, 1990: Nick Davis (minors) and Steve LaRose (minors) were traded by the Mets to the Houston Astros for Dan Schatzeder.

Roster

Player stats

Batting

Starters by position
Note: Pos = Position; G = Games played; AB = At bats; H = Hits; Avg. = Batting average; HR = Home runs; RBI = Runs batted in

Other batters
Note: G = Games played; AB = At bats; H = Hits; Avg. = Batting average; HR = Home runs; RBI = Runs batted in

Pitching

Starting pitchers
Note: G = Games pitched; IP = Innings pitched; W = Wins; L = Losses; ERA = Earned run average; SO = Strikeouts

Other pitchers
Note: G = Games pitched; IP = Innings pitched; W = Wins; L = Losses; ERA = Earned run average; SO = Strikeouts

Relief pitchers
Note: G = Games pitched; W = Wins; L = Losses; SV = Saves; ERA = Earned run average; SO = Strikeouts

Farm system

References

External links

1990 New York Mets at Baseball Reference
1990 New York Mets team page at www.baseball-almanac.com

New York Mets seasons
New York Mets season
1990 in sports in New York City
1990s in Queens